Moscow City Duma District 22 is one of 45 constituencies in Moscow City Duma. The constituency has covered parts of South-Eastern Moscow since 2014. From 1993-2005 District 22 was based in Southern Moscow; however, after the number of constituencies was reduced to 15 in 2005, the constituency was eliminated.

Members elected

Election results

2001

|-
! colspan=2 style="background-color:#E9E9E9;text-align:left;vertical-align:top;" |Candidate
! style="background-color:#E9E9E9;text-align:left;vertical-align:top;" |Party
! style="background-color:#E9E9E9;text-align:right;" |Votes
! style="background-color:#E9E9E9;text-align:right;" |%
|-
|style="background-color:"|
|align=left|Yevgeny Balashov (incumbent)
|align=left|Independent
|
|58.94%
|-
|style="background-color:"|
|align=left|Vladimir Gavrilov
|align=left|Communist Party
|
|19.13%
|-
|style="background-color:#000000"|
|colspan=2 |against all
|
|16.63%
|-
| colspan="5" style="background-color:#E9E9E9;"|
|- style="font-weight:bold"
| colspan="3" style="text-align:left;" | Total
| 
| 100%
|-
| colspan="5" style="background-color:#E9E9E9;"|
|- style="font-weight:bold"
| colspan="4" |Source:
|
|}

2014

|-
! colspan=2 style="background-color:#E9E9E9;text-align:left;vertical-align:top;" |Candidate
! style="background-color:#E9E9E9;text-align:left;vertical-align:top;" |Party
! style="background-color:#E9E9E9;text-align:right;" |Votes
! style="background-color:#E9E9E9;text-align:right;" |%
|-
|style="background-color:"|
|align=left|Inna Svyatenko
|align=left|United Russia
|
|55.67%
|-
|style="background-color:"|
|align=left|Vladimir Volkov
|align=left|Communist Party
|
|17.87%
|-
|style="background-color:"|
|align=left|Marina Karavayeva
|align=left|Yabloko
|
|9.82%
|-
|style="background-color:"|
|align=left|Aleksandr Vlasov
|align=left|Liberal Democratic Party
|
|9.34%
|-
|style="background-color:"|
|align=left|Valery Solyanin
|align=left|A Just Russia
|
|4.09%
|-
| colspan="5" style="background-color:#E9E9E9;"|
|- style="font-weight:bold"
| colspan="3" style="text-align:left;" | Total
| 
| 100%
|-
| colspan="5" style="background-color:#E9E9E9;"|
|- style="font-weight:bold"
| colspan="4" |Source:
|
|}

2019

|-
! colspan=2 style="background-color:#E9E9E9;text-align:left;vertical-align:top;" |Candidate
! style="background-color:#E9E9E9;text-align:left;vertical-align:top;" |Party
! style="background-color:#E9E9E9;text-align:right;" |Votes
! style="background-color:#E9E9E9;text-align:right;" |%
|-
|style="background-color:"|
|align=left|Inna Svyatenko (incumbent)
|align=left|Independent
|
|44.93%
|-
|style="background-color:"|
|align=left|Dmitry Sarayev
|align=left|Communist Party
|
|32.59%
|-
|style="background-color:"|
|align=left|Anton Yegorov
|align=left|Liberal Democratic Party
|
|7.32%
|-
|style="background-color:"|
|align=left|Dmitry Monastyrev
|align=left|A Just Russia
|
|5.47%
|-
|style="background-color:"|
|align=left|Vladimir Badmayev
|align=left|Communists of Russia
|
|5.35%
|-
| colspan="5" style="background-color:#E9E9E9;"|
|- style="font-weight:bold"
| colspan="3" style="text-align:left;" | Total
| 
| 100%
|-
| colspan="5" style="background-color:#E9E9E9;"|
|- style="font-weight:bold"
| colspan="4" |Source:
|
|}

References

Moscow City Duma districts